Ruttelerona cessaria is a moth of the family Geometridae first described by Francis Walker in 1860. It is found in Sri Lanka and South India.

References

Moths of Asia
Moths described in 1860